
Year 313 BC was a year of the pre-Julian Roman calendar. At the time, it was known as the Year of the Consulship of Cursor and Brutus (or, less frequently, year 441 Ab urbe condita). The denomination 313 BC for this year has been used since the early medieval period, when the Anno Domini calendar era became the prevalent method in Europe for naming years.

Events 
 By place 
 Macedonian Empire
Antigonus sends Telesphorus (general) to the Peloponnesus to free the cities.

 Egypt 
 Ptolemy, whose Egyptian kingdom includes Cyprus, puts down a revolt there. A revolt in Cyrene is also crushed.

 Greece 
 Becoming tired of the Macedonian rule, the people of Epirus recall their former king Aeacides. Cassander immediately sends an army against him under his brother, Philip, who is diverted from invading Aetolia. 
 Philip defeats Aeacides in a battle. Aeacides, with the remnant of his forces, joins the Aetolians. A second battle takes place, in which Philip is again victorious, and Aeacides is killed. The remaining Aetolian army takes refuge in the surrounding mountains.

Asia 
 Asander agrees to send all his soldiers to Antigonus to help keep Greek cities autonomous 
 Asander sends emissaries to Ptolemy and Seleucus asking for help

Births

Deaths 
 Aeacides, King of Epirus

References